Hartvig Marcus Frisch (7 September 1754 – 22 August 1816) was a Danish businessman who served as director of the Royal Greenland Trading Department from 1781 to 1816. The Frisch House, his former home in Copenhagen, located at Nytorv 5, was designed by Nicolai Abildgaard. It is listed on the Danish registry of protected buildings and places.

Early life and family
Frisch was born in Helsingør in 1754. His father, who was also called Hartvig Marcus Frisch (1709–81), was inspector at Øresind Custom House. His mother was Jacobine Henriette Henrici, 1725–69).

Career
Frisch was in 1771 employed by Det Altonaiske Bankkontor. In 1774, he assumed a position as secretary for at Øresund Custom House. He assisted his father who, as a German-speaking Holsteiner, was challenged by the increasing use of Danish under Ove Høegh-Guldberg's years in office. In 1776, the same year that his father was granted pension, Frisch was promoted to protecollist. In 1781, after his father's death, he was initially appointed to senior supervisor (overtilsynsførende) of the Iceland-Finmark Trading Company but and later that same year to director of the Danish Royal Greenland Company with title of  justitsråd. Heinrich Schimmelmann recommended him for the positions. In 1782, Friederich Martini (1739–1821) was appointed as co-director.

In 1788, Frisch became a member of the Royal Greenland Trade Commission. In 1792, he also acted as director of Realisationskommissionen for det danske, norske, slesvigske og holstenske forenede handels- og kanalkompagni as well as a member of various commissions related to North Atlantic trade. In 1813, he was appointed to etatsråd.

Property
Frisch constructed a house at Nytorv 5 in 1799–1803. The building was designed by Nicolai Abildgaard and is now listed.

He owned the estate Vodroffgård outside Copenhagen from 1794 to 1803. The estate was both managed as a farm and the site of a water-powered factory. In 1810, Frisch purchased the estate Charlottendal at Slagelse.

Personal life
Frisch married Dorothea (Dorthe) Tutein (1764–1814), a daughter of merchant and textile manufacturer Peter Tutein and Pauline Maria Tutein, on 10 January 1783 in Frederick's German Church. They had the children Theodor Frisch (born 1787), Emil Frisch (born 1790), Henriette Pauline Frisch (born c. 1787), Sophie Frederikke Frisch (born 1796)and Constantin Frisch (born 1793).

Frisch belonged to the German congregations in Copenhagen and Helsingør. He died in Ems on 22 August 1816. The ship that transported his coffin home wrecked.

References

External links
 Hartvig Marcus Frisch at Geni
 Kronprinsensgade 3 constructed for him

1754 births
1816 deaths
Danish civil servants
18th-century Danish businesspeople
Danish businesspeople in shipping
19th-century Danish businesspeople
People from Helsingør
Danish people of German descent